Stocaigh (Stockay) is one of the Monach Islands. It is a kilometre east of Coilleag Mhòr nan Dàmh in the far north east of Ceann Ear. On its east shore is the Camas Bàn, which is named for its white sand, which consists of finely ground sea shells.

Footnotes

Monach Islands
Uninhabited islands of the Outer Hebrides